Umurlar can refer to the following villages in Turkey:

 Umurlar, Dursunbey
 Umurlar, Göynük
 Umurlar, Sındırgı
 Umurlar, Yenice